Vilcabamba District is one of eight districts of the province Daniel Alcides Carrión in Peru.

References